Paduch is a surname. Notable people with the surname include:

 Abigail Paduch (born 2000), Australian judoka
 Arno Paduch (born 1965), German musician
 Marzena Paduch (born 1965), Polish politician

See also
 

Polish-language surnames